Maarten, Baron van der Goes van Dirxland (3 January 1751, The Hague - 10 July 1826, The Hague) was a Dutch politician who served as government minister. He was a moderate within the Patriots faction that came to govern the Batavian Republic. His son Louis Napoleon van der Goes van Dirxland was also active as a minister.

Life
Van der Goes came from a family of regenten in The Hague and his father, Adriaan van der Goes, was the town's mayor. Maarten van der Goes entered the diplomatic service in 1785, in which he was sent to Copenhagen, then Madrid from 1793 to 1796. He was then secretary to the second national assembly of the Batavian Republic and became its foreign minister on 8 October 1798. At the end of July 1803, Van der Goes, Gerard Brantsen and Jan Bernd Bicker formed a Batavian deputation sent to Napoleon Bonaparte at Brussels, where Bonaparte was visiting the French departments in what is now Belgium. Van der Goes remained foreign minister until 19 June 1808. During May 1807, he was also the interim minister for justice and the police.

After France's annexation of Holland in 1810, Van der Goes entered the First French Empire's Corps législatif as the representative of the department of Bouches-de-la-Meuse. He was made Grand Treasurer of the Order of the Reunion on 22 February 1813 and a baron de l'Empire on 27 January 1813. Maarten van der Goes returned to the Netherlands on Napoleon's fall and became a faithful supporter of the new king William I of the Netherlands, who ennobled him in 1814 and made him a baron in 1821. Van der Goes entered the Senate on 21 September 1815, remaining in it until his death in 1826.

Titles and decorations 
 Grand-cross of the order of the Union, 16 February 1807
 Grand-cross and grand-trésorier of the order of the Reunion, 22 February 1812
 Officer of the Légion d'honneur, 5 January 1811
 Baron de l'Empire, 27 January 1813
 knight, 9 December 1814
 Commander of the Order of the Netherlands Lion, 1815
 baron, 3 mars 1821

External links 
  His page on parlement.com

1751 births
1826 deaths
Politicians from The Hague
18th-century Dutch diplomats
Members of the Dutch Patriots faction
Officiers of the Légion d'honneur
Barons of the First French Empire
People of the Kingdom of Holland